Oceanos-Prêmio de Literatura em Língua Portuguesa (until 2014 Portugal Telecom Prize for Literature Portuguese: Prêmio Portugal Telecom de Literatura) is a Brazilian literary award established in 2003 by Portugal Telecom and awarded annually to Brazilian literature. From 2007 onwards, Portuguese-language works from other countries are also eligible.

In 2014 Portugal Telecom was bought by the French company Altice. From 2015 on, the prize was named Oceanos- Prêmio de Literatura em Língua Portuguesa (Oceans- Portuguese Language Literature Prize) sponsored by Itaú Cultural foundation.

Winners

Note
This article includes content from the Portuguese Wikipedia article Prêmio Portugal Telecom de Literatura.

References

External links
 Official website

Awards established in 2003
Portuguese-language literary awards
Brazilian literary awards
2003 establishments in Brazil